De stille genieter (English title: The Silent Hedonist) is a Belgian comedy film directed, produced, co-written and edited by Edith Kiel. It was her final film.

External links
 

1961 films
1960s Dutch-language films
Belgian black-and-white films
1961 comedy films
Films set in Belgium
Films shot in Belgium